The , also called the JR Pass, is a rail pass for overseas visitors sold by the Japan Railways Group, and is valid for travel on all major forms of transportation provided by the JR Group in Japan, with a few exceptions. The Rail Pass is designed to stimulate travel and tourism throughout the country. It is only cost effective for long-distance travel, particularly by bullet train. While the savings from extensive travel can be considerable, those who travel too little may in fact lose money on a rail pass. The Japan Rail Pass is of limited use within larger cities, as private operators generally do not accept the Rail Pass. In Tokyo, for instance, it covers the Yamanote Line which goes to several popular tourist areas, as well as in Osaka on the Osaka Loop Line, plus in Kyoto on the Nara Line and Sagano Line.

Rail Pass

Furthermore, the pass is time limited based on the length of pass purchased. Three time periods are available: seven, fourteen and twenty-one consecutive day passes, which provide the user nearly unlimited use of JR transportation services. The table below summarizes the prices for each pass. The amounts are listed in Japanese Yen. When purchasing the Exchange Order (see below), the purchaser will pay the appropriate amount in the purchaser's home country currency based on the current exchange rate. 

Purchase before going to Japan:

Purchase in Japan (Trial):

Exchange Order

While the Rail Pass is sold by the JR Group, it is obtained by purchasing an Exchange Order from a travel agency located outside Japan. The exchange order can also be purchased from All Nippon Airways; Japan Airlines stopped selling exchange orders in March 2017. The Exchange Order cannot be obtained in Japan. However, from March 8, 2017 to March 31, 2022 (Extended), as part of a trial basis, the Japan Rail Pass will be available for direct purchase in Japan at a select number of major airports and train stations, though at a higher price of between 10%-13% depending on the pass type.

The Exchange Order will have a 90 day validity period from the date it's issued by an Authorized Seller. It then needs to be exchanged over to a Japan Rail Pass in Japan within that time period. 

The Exchange Order itself cannot be used for travel, and must be exchanged at a JR Midori no Madoguchi ticket office at designated major JR train stations.

Valid transportation
The pass is valid for travel on Japan Railways Group (JR) transportation throughout the country in the class of service indicated on the pass.

Train
The pass is valid on all JR-operated lines, including the Shinkansen (with the exception of Nozomi and Mizuho services on the Tōkaidō, San'yō and Kyushu Shinkansen),  trains and regular commuter services, including  and  trains.

The pass is also valid on the following non-JR lines:
Tokyo Monorail between Hamamatsuchō and Haneda Airport
Aoimori Railway, for the following journeys (local and rapid services only): 
 Starting and ending at Hachinohe and Aomori
 Starting and ending at Hachinohe and Noheji, or Aomori and Noheji, in order to access the JR East Ōminato Line
IR Ishikawa Railway for journeys starting and ending at Kanazawa and Tsubata only, in order to access the JR West Nanao Line
Ainokaze Toyama Railway for journeys starting and ending at Toyama and Takaoka only, in order to access the JR West Johana Line and Himi Line (local services only)
Tokyo Metro Chiyoda Line between Ayase Station and Kitasenju Station , since a part of Tokyo Metro Chiyoda Line is considered as Jōban Line.

Bus
The pass is valid on the local routes of the following bus companies:
JR Hokkaido Bus Company
JR Bus Tohoku Company
JR Bus Kantō Company
JR Tōkai Bus Company
West JR Bus Company
Chūgoku JR Bus Company
JR Shikoku Bus Company
JR Kyushu Bus Company

It is not valid on JR highway buses and Community buses which JR Bus is entrusted.

Ferry
The pass is also valid for travel on JR Ferry service on the following route:
 
Miyajima – Miyajimaguchi

Conditions of exchange
The Rail Pass is designed for tourist use, and therefore has conditions for its purchase and exchange.

Eligibility
The user must meet one of the following two conditions:
A foreign tourist visiting Japan, who has a passport bearing the "Temporary Visitor" entry status stamped at immigration, and who can present the actual passport at the time of exchange.  A photocopy of the passport is not acceptable.
People who have both their Japanese passport and written proof—obtained from the embassy or legation of Japan in the foreign country where they live—that they have been living legally in the country for 10 consecutive years or more.

Validity period of the exchange order
The exchange order must be exchanged for a Japan Rail Pass within three months from the date the order was issued.

Exchange procedure
The person designated on the Exchange Order must apply for the Rail Pass at an exchange office, and there,
Present the order, along with passport.
Fill in the application form provided at the office.
Specify the desired first day of use, which must be within one month from the date of exchange.  For example, if the exchange is made on January 1, then the date of first travel must be selected before February 1.

Conditions of use

The Rail Pass is valid on almost all forms of transportation (train, bus and ferry) operated by the companies of the JR Group. However, there are exceptions and conditions of use of the Rail Pass.

The Rail Pass is non-transferable and can only be used by the person designated on the pass.
The user must present his/her passport upon request.
Starting on June 1st, 2020, the pass is issued on a standard green JR ticket, allowing automatic ticket gates to be used.  Previously, Rail Pass holders had their tickets laminated to an A6 card and needed to enter and exit stations through a staffed gate presenting their pass to a ticketing officer.
Seat reservations can be made without additional payment. Seat reservations can be made at all JR Midori no Madoguchi ticket offices. Starting on June 1st, 2020, reservations can also be made using a Reserved Seat Vending Machine.  
In the event that an Exchange Order or a Japan Rail Pass is lost or stolen, no replacements can be provided.
Use of a private compartment is not covered by the Rail Pass and requires an additional charge.
Use of a sleeping compartment on overnight trains is not covered by the Rail Pass and requires payment of the limited express fare and the accommodation charge. 
Use of the Nozomi and Mizuho services on the Tokaido, Sanyo and Kyushu Shinkansen lines is not covered by the Japan Rail Pass and requires the purchase of a separate ticket and payment of the full fare.
Use of the Gran Class car on the Tohoku, Hokkaido, Joetsu and Hokuriku Shinkansen lines requires the payments of the Shinkansen express charge and the Gran Class surcharge.
Use of the DX Green Car by JR Kyushu or the Premium Green Car on the Saphir Odoriko limited express service by JR East requires the payments of the limited express charge and the DX Green / Premium Green Car surcharge.
Some trains, such as the Narita Express and the Hayabusa shinkansen service, require mandatory seat reservations, which are free of charge.
Use of the JR Beetle Fukuoka to Busan hydrofoil ferry service is normally not covered by the Rail Pass and requires an additional charge. There however are exceptions as travel agencies in Korea sell special types of Kyushu Rail Pass (valid within JR Kyushu network) which includes a round-trip ticket on the hydrofoil from Busan.
The Rail Pass does not cover city subways (though local JR lines such as the Yamanote line are covered).
The Rail Pass is good for either 7, 14 or 21 consecutive days, and a day starts and ends at midnight. That means, for example, if a visitor activates his or her pass for immediate use on July 1st at 12 noon, that pass will expire at midnight on July 7th, not July 8th at 12 noon.
It is possible to activate a Japan Rail Pass with a future date (within 30 days) to be the first day. This allows Japan Rail Pass users to start using their pass within its validity period at any JR station at any time the station is open.
Even if the Japan Rail Pass expires at midnight, if one is already on a train when it expires, the holder can continue to ride it until he or she gets off at any station or the train reaches its terminus.

Other information 
JR Group has announced that it will be selling Japan Rail Passes inside Japan to tourists on an experimental basis from  
March 8, 2017 ‒ March 31, 2022.

The Japan Rail Pass also allows the holders to obtain discounts when staying at JR Group Hotels.

Regional Rail Passes are also available for JR-Hokkaido, JR-Central, JR-East, JR-West, JR-Shikoku, and JR-Kyushu lines. Unlike the full JR Pass, some regional passes (in particular those sold by JR West) allow holders to travel on Nozomi and Mizuho trains. Some may have limitations on seat reservations, however.

From spring 2020, users of the Japan Rail Pass will be able to make seat reservations for trains over the internet in four languages (English, Korean, Simplified Chinese and Traditional Chinese) and use automatic ticket gates at stations.

References

External links

 

Passenger rail transport in Japan
Rail passes